Whangape was a cargo ship measured at , built in 1899 by Sir Raylton Dixon & Co., Middlesbrough. The vessel was constructed for the British Maritime Trust as Adriana, sold while on the slips to Elder, Dempster & Company and renamed Asaba. Her engine was built by T Richardson & Sons, Hartlepool.

"Whangape" (pronounced: fun gah' pay) is a Māori word meaning "waiting for the inside of the pipi." The pipi is a bivalve mollusk native to New Zealand.

The vessel was completed on 1 March 1900 and sold to the Union Steamship Company of New Zealand. After being chartered by the Royal Australian Navy, she took part in operations against the German colonies in the Pacific with the Australian Naval and Military Expeditionary Force (AN&MEF) during the First World War in 1914 and subsequently returned to her owners. Whangape was sold in 1928 to Chun Young Zan (Moller & Co) and renamed SS Nanking.

Fate
Nanking was scrapped in China in 1935.

Footnotes

References

External links
  [Tees Built Ships website]
 1908 stern view photo in dry dock

1899 ships
Auxiliary ships of the Royal Australian Navy
Ships of the Union Steam Ship Company
Ships built on the River Tees